New Castle Area Transit Authority is a public transportation service located in Lawrence County, Pennsylvania. It provides inter-city bus and paratransit service to select communities within the county. Because the region is located within the metropolitan (but not the urban) area of Pittsburgh, service is provided to the downtown area.

Connections can no longer be made to Youngstown's Western Reserve Transit Authority.  The western end point of the New Castle system is on Route 91, on U.S. 422 at the Country Manor Social Hall at the Ohio/Pennsylvania border , about 3 miles from the easternmost point in the WRTA system (Route 32 Wilson-Struthers, U.S. 422 at Struthers-Liberty Road).   The New Castle system formerly served the nearby Lincoln Knolls Plaza and made a direct connection with the WRTA route, but New Castle buses no longer enter Ohio.

Route list

All routes run Monday though Saturday and terminate at the Downtown New Castle transfer center, unless otherwise noted.

1- Highland Avenue/Shenley Square- serves New Castle city
2- North City/Neshannock- serves New Castle city, Neshannock Township (Northwest New Castle)
3- Westgate Plaza/Union- serves New Castle city, Union Township (Oakwood), Westgate & Union Shopping Centers
4- Westside/Mahoningtown- serves New Castle city, Bessemer, Union Township (Mahoningtown)
5- Southside/Moravia Street- serves New Castle city
6- Cascade Park/Lawrence Village- serves New Castle City, Shenango Township, Lawrence Village Shopping Plaza
7- Croton Avenue/Lower Eastside- serves New Castle city, Hickory Township
8- Gaston Park/Upper Eastside- serves New Castle City, Shenango Township
11- Jefferson Street- serves New Castle city
71- Pittsburgh- New Castle city, Shenango Township, Portersville Park & Ride, Evans City Park & Ride to Downtown Pittsburgh (weekdays)
75- New Wilmington/Volant- Volant, New Wilmington, Wilmington Township to New Castle city (Wednesday & Thursday only)
76- New Castle/Ellwood City- Ellwood City, Ellport, Franklin Township to Lawrence Village Plaza, New Castle city, Union Plaza (Monday, Tuesday, & Friday only)
81- Iron Mountain- New Castle city, Hickory Township, Scott Township, Slippery Rock, Slippery Rock Township to Iron Mountain Facility (weekday rush hour)
91- School of Trades/Villa Maria- Pulaski Township (New Bedford), Villa Maria spiritual center, New Castle School of Trades to Union Plaza, New Castle city

Park & Ride Lots (for Pittsburgh Service)
I-79 Exit 83 (Jackson Township)- 75 spaces
I-79 Exit 96 (Portersville)- 79 spaces
Route 422 (Slippery Rock Township)- 40 spaces
New Castle Transit Center- 173 spaces
Transit Authority Offices (New Castle)- 25 spaces

References

External links
newcastletransit.org
Shawn Bennear's History Of New Castle Area Transit Authority

Bus transportation in Pennsylvania
Paratransit services in the United States
Intermodal transportation authorities in the United States
Municipal authorities in Pennsylvania
Transportation in Lawrence County, Pennsylvania
Government of Lawrence County, Pennsylvania